Cipher (Alisa Tager) is a fictional mutant character, a superhero appearing in American comic books published by Marvel Comics. She is a young African-American woman who first appeared in Young X-Men #8 (Nov. 2008) and was created by Marc Guggenheim and Rafa Sandoval.

Publication history
Cipher's first appearance was in Young X-Men #8 by writer Marc Guggenheim and artist Rafa Sandoval.  However, references to her character began in Young X-Men #3 and were initially written to deceptively reference long-deceased New Mutants character Cypher.  Through retcons, Cipher is depicted as having been present during events prior to her character's creation, including Grant Morrison's 2001 run on New X-Men and Joss Whedon's 2004 tenure on Astonishing X-Men.  She became a featured character in the series Young X-Men, and after that series ended, she appeared in Uncanny X-Men and Wolverine and the X-Men as part of the student cast.

Fictional character biography
A new character in the ongoing series Young X-Men, Graymalkin, mentions a "Cypher" twice. The first is when he is alone in the air ducts inside of the Danger Cave. He mentions that he is "not the only one that can help them. There is Cypher". The second time is when he tells Donald Pierce, who was disguised as Cyclops, that "Cypher told [him] everything".

The new "Cypher," an African-American girl named Alisa Tager, reveals herself at the end of Young X-Men #8, however her codename is spelled "Cipher" rather than "Cypher" (as it is spelled in earlier mentions).  She had come to warn Ink that his teammates were in trouble and he is needed to come with her to save them. Although Ink is very skeptical about this young girl's motivations or intentions, she is shown wearing the standard uniform of the Young X-Men, and has a jet from the X-Men's headquarters to transport him to his team as well, to show that her information is legitimate, even though she refuses to give any more information, about herself or the team, other than that. However, she also gives into his demand to take him to his tattooist to give him some new abilities, even though she voices that she feels he is wasting his time while his friends are "dead or dying."  She is still able to get him to the battle with the Y-Men in time, though, where Ink is able to turn the tide and save his teammates.  Revealing herself in order to save the Young X-Men causes several members of the team and X-Men faculty to question who she is and why they had never been aware of her.

Cyclops reveals that Cipher was first discovered during events depicted in New X-Men vol. 2. During a riot in Mutant Town, Jean Grey was able to detect Alisa's presence. Jean and Cyclops chose to keep Alisa's presence a secret, per her-own request, giving her the codename "Cipher," an act made easier by Alisa's mutant ability to become completely undetectable either psychically or physically. In the meantime, Cipher developed a friendship with Blindfold, secretly communicating with her during past events in Astonishing X-Men vol. 3, explaining Ruth's behaviour of seemingly talking to herself. Cipher was also present to greet Graymalkin when he awoke during the events of X-Men: Messiah Complex and present for various other events in Young X-Men, always secretly assisting the team. Her newly revealed presence generated feelings of uneasiness and anger over their seeming lack of privacy and Cipher's ability to go about undetected in their lives.

In a conversation with Alisa, Cyclops theorizes that she had chosen to reveal herself out of a subconscious desire to make herself known to those around her. Regardless, Alisa remains uneasy of her "outing" as she fears an individual only referred to as "he" will now know where to find her and will come for her. Cyclops assures her that "he" will have to get through the X-Men to reach her, reassuring Alisa enough for her to decide to drop her stealth mode. She is next seen helping containing the riots in San Francisco alongside Colossus. Following the split between Wolverine and Cyclops in Schism, Cipher decides to return to Westchester with Wolverine and become a student at the newly renamed "Jean Grey School for Higher Learning".

Powers and abilities
Cipher's abilities include full spectrum invisibility and complete stealth, able to mask even her psychic imprint from most telepaths with the exception of particularly high-level telepaths like Jean Grey. She is also able to enter a phased state making her capable of passing through solid objects and levitating through the air.  She also exhibits the ability to mask her voice to only those she chooses.  Coupled with her invisibility, this makes her a highly adept spy, and she was employed as such by Cyclops.

She is also able to pilot the X-Men's jets.

References

External links
 

2008 comics debuts
African-American superheroes
Fictional characters who can turn intangible
Fictional characters who can turn invisible
Marvel Comics mutants
Fictional secret agents and spies
Marvel Comics American superheroes
Comics characters introduced in 2008
Characters created by Marc Guggenheim
Marvel Comics female superheroes